The 1948 Tennessee A&I Tigers football team was an American football team that represented Tennessee Agricultural & Industrial State College as a member of the Midwest Athletic Association (MAA) during the 1948 college football season. In their fifth season under head coach Henry Kean, the Tigers compiled a 5–3–1 record and outscored opponents by a total of 205 to 67.

Schedule

References

Tennessee A&I
Tennessee State Tigers football seasons
Tennessee A&I Tigers football